Isabelle Mancini (born July 26, 1967 in Arbois, Jura) is a French cross-country skier who competed from 1988 to 1994. Competing in two Winter Olympics, she earned her best finishes at Albertville in 1992 with a fifth in the 4 × 5 km relay overall, and ninth in the 5 km + 10 km combined pursuit individually.

Mancini's best finish at the FIS Nordic World Ski Championships was tenth in the 30 km event at Val di Fiemme in 1991. Her best World Cup finish was sixth in a 15 km event in the United States in 1989.

Mancini's lone individual victory was in a 10 km Continental Cup event in France in 1993.

Cross-country skiing results
All results are sourced from the International Ski Federation (FIS).

Olympic Games

World Championships

World Cup

Season standings

References

External links

Women's 4 x 5 km cross-country relay Olympic results: 1976-2002 

1967 births
Cross-country skiers at the 1992 Winter Olympics
Cross-country skiers at the 1994 Winter Olympics
French female cross-country skiers
Living people
Olympic cross-country skiers of France
20th-century French women